The 2019 Sydney Women's Sevens was the third tournament within the 2018–19 World Rugby Women's Sevens Series and the third edition of the Australian Women's Sevens. It was held over the weekend of 1–3 February 2019 at Spotless Stadium in Sydney, with former venue Allianz Stadium closed for rebuilding. It was run alongside the men's tournament.

Format
The teams are drawn into three pools of four teams each. Each team plays every other team in their pool once. The top two teams from each pool advance to the Cup brackets while the top 2 third place teams also compete in the Cup/Plate. The other teams from each group play-off for the Challenge Trophy.

Teams
Eleven core teams are participating in the tournament along with one invited team, the highest-placing non-core team of the 2018 Oceania Women's Sevens Championship, Papua New Guinea:

Pool stage
All times in Australian Eastern Daylight Time (UTC+11:00)

Pool A

Pool B

Pool C

Knockout stage

Challenge Trophy

5th Place

Cup

Tournament placings

Source: World Rugby

Players

Scoring leaders

Source: World Rugby

See also
 World Rugby Women's Sevens Series
 2018–19 World Rugby Women's Sevens Series
 2019 Sydney Sevens

References

External links
 Tournament site
 World Rugby info

2019
2018–19 World Rugby Women's Sevens Series
2019 in Australian women's sport
2019 in women's rugby union
2019 in Australian rugby union
February 2019 sports events in Australia